The 1994 Philadelphia Eagles season was their 62nd in the National Football League (NFL). On May 6, 1994, the NFL approved the transfer of majority interest in the team from Norman Braman to Jeffrey Lurie. The team failed to improve upon their previous output of 8–8, winning only seven games and failing to qualify for the playoffs.

Rich Kotite's fate as Eagles head coach was sealed after a seven-game losing streak to end the season knocked Philly from the top of the NFC at 7–2 all the way to fourth place in the Eastern Division. One key injury was the season-ending broken leg suffered by linebacker Byron Evans, who was lost in game #10 against Cleveland.

The epitome of this collapse came on Christmas Eve at Cincinnati, when the 2–13 Bengals scored six points in the final seconds – thanks in part to the recovery of a fumbled kick return – to steal a win.

The high point of the '94 season occurred on October 2 at Candlestick Park, when the Eagles steamrolled the eventual Super Bowl winning 49ers by a 40–8 count.

Offseason

NFL draft 

The 1994 NFL draft was held April 24–25, 1994. This was the first draft in which the rounds were reduced to seven in total.

Personnel

Staff

Roster

Regular season

Schedule 

Note: Intra-division opponents are in bold text.

Game summaries

Week 1 
Sunday, September 4, 1994 – Kickoff 1:01 PM Eastern
Played at Giants Stadium with 68F degrees and 11 MPH wind

'1st Quarter Highlights
QB Dave Brown intercepted by Mark McMillian of the Eagles.
KR Jeff Snyder fumbles and the Giants recover.
Giants RB Rodney Hampton 1 yard TD run. (7–0 Giants)
Giants PR Dave Meggett returns punt 68 yard TD (14–0 Giants)

Week 17 
Saturday, December 24, 1994 Kickoff 1:00 PM Eastern

Played at Riverfront Stadium on an AstroTurf playing surface in 38F degrees with a 12 MPH wind

Standings

Postseason 
Shortly after the season ended, head coach Rich Kotite was fired. There were rumors that the Eagles new owner Jeffrey Lurie would not keep him on as coach. His fate was sealed when, after a 7-2 start, the Eagles lost the last 7 games of the season and missed the playoffs.

During the few weeks the Eagles would interview outside the organization for a replacement, they had to wait until the Super Bowl was played to talk to candidates from the teams in the playoffs. Less than a week after Super Bowl XXIX, won by the San Francisco 49ers, the Eagles hired their defensive coordinator Ray Rhodes.

References

External links 
 1994 Philadelphia Eagles at Pro-Football-Reference.com

Philadelphia Eagles seasons
Philadelphia Eagles
Philadelphia Eagles